623 C Street is the second album led by saxophonist Ralph Moore which was recorded in 1987 and released on the Dutch Criss Cross Jazz label.

Reception 

In his review on AllMusic, Scott Yanow stated "Displaying a tone on tenor similar to John Coltrane's, Moore's note choices are more original than his sound. A solid modern mainstream set".

Track listing 
 "Un Poco Loco" (Bud Powell) – 10:22
 "Christina" (Buster Williams) – 4:42	
 "Black Diamond" (Wayne Shorter) – 6:06
 "It Never Entered My Mind" (Richard Rodgers, Lorenz Hart) – 6:53 Additional track on CD reissue
 "Cecilia" (David Kikoski) – 7:27	
 "623 C Street" (Ralph Moore) – 8:49
 "Deceptacon" (Williams) – 7:05
 "Speak Low" (Kurt Weill, Ogden Nash) – 8:20 Additional track on CD reissue
Recorded at Van Gelder Studio, Englewood Cliffs, NJ on February 27, 1987 (tracks 1-3 & 5-7) and December 31, 1987 (tracks 4 & 8)

Personnel 
Ralph Moore – tenor saxophone, soprano saxophone
David Kikoski – piano
Buster Williams – bass 
Billy Hart – drums

References 

Ralph Moore albums
1987 albums
Criss Cross Jazz albums
Albums recorded at Van Gelder Studio